Richard Ellis Sligh (August 18, 1944 – December 23, 2008) was an American football defensive tackle who played for the Oakland Raiders of the American Football League (AFL).

Football career
Sligh graduated from Gallman High School in Newberry, South Carolina and played college football at North Carolina Central University, where he was on Dean's List, for high academic achievement, as well as having a Biology Major and Chemistry Minor from 1962 to 1966.

He was chosen in the 10th round of the 1967 NFL/AFL Draft as a defensive tackle.

During his time in the league he played in a total of eight games. Sligh was a reserve for the Oakland Raiders in Super Bowl II, when the Raiders fell to the Green Bay Packers. In 1968, he was chosen by the expansion Cincinnati Bengals in the AFL Allocation Draft, but he was waived prior to the regular season.

Height
At 7 ft 0 in, Sligh is the tallest player in professional American football history. The next tallest are Matt O'Donnell at 6 ft 11 in,  Morris Stroud at 6 ft 10 in, and Dan Skipper at 6 ft 10 in.

See also
 List of American Football League players

References

1944 births
2008 deaths
African-American players of American football
American football defensive tackles
North Carolina Central Eagles football players
Oakland Raiders players
People from Newberry, South Carolina
Players of American football from South Carolina
American Football League players
20th-century African-American sportspeople
21st-century African-American people